Westfield Carindale, colloquially known as 'Carindale', is a large shopping centre in Queensland located in the suburb of Carindale, east of Brisbane.  The centre is one of the largest shopping centres in Australia. The centre contains over 450 specialty stores and almost 6,000 car parking spaces. Other features include a food court, a Brisbane City Council Library, and a state of the art luxury Glasshouse Dining Precinct.

History 
First opened in 1979, it was Brisbane's largest shopping centre (at 116,884 square metres or 1,258,139 sq ft). In 1996 Suncorp floated the property as the Suncorp Property Trust.

In March 1999 it became the first centre in Queensland to have two Major Department Stores in the one centre.

It was managed for twenty years by Jones Lang LaSalle until October 1999 when The Westfield Group launched a bid for Suncorps 50% of the trust. The Westfield bid was successful and the trust was renamed Carindale Property Trust in addition to a re-branding of the centre. Suncorp sold its remaining 50% as part of the sale of Suncorp Retail Property Fund to Lend Lease Groups Australian Prime Property Fund in 2001.

In October 2010, Westfield Carindale commenced a $300 million redevelopment which added approximately 22,000 square metres of retail to the centre. Stage one of the project opened on 29 March 2012 and featured over 75 new retail tenancies in a new 2 level parallel mall, a full-line Coles Supermarket and a larger relocated Target discount department store.

Stage Two of the development opened on 9 August 2012 and included a strong focus on Australian and International fashion brands. New precincts revealed top brands such as Adidas, Aesop, Kookai, Leona Edmiston, Marcs, Mecca Maxima, Saba and Scotch & Soda. Other features of the redevelopment includes a new Brisbane City Council Library, a new restaurant precinct (The Glasshouse) and an improved car park management system which includes parking guidance assistance. Westfield Carindale was also home to the newest 'Event Cinemas' complex in Queensland until a newer complex opened in North Lakes in 2015.

In December 2013 Carindale opened their first ever indoor children's play centre 'We Play' located on level 3 near the "Go Health gym".
Parents can drop off their child for a maximum of 2 hours whilst they go shop and have the We Play staff supervise.

In 2019, David Jones was converted into a single-level store due to less customers. It is located at the Ground Floor.

In 2020, a new Kmart store opened. It is located at Level 1 of where the David Jones used to be.

Transport
Carindale bus station is a major transport hub for the area, providing access to three major universities, the Redland Shire and the Brisbane CBD. The proposed future Carindale busway station as part of the Eastern Busway will provide extra and more efficient public transport.

Amenities 
The Brisbane City Council operate a public library in Westfield Carindale.

See also
Westfield Group
Carindale, Queensland

References

External links

Westfield Group
Shopping centres in Brisbane
Shopping malls established in 1979